Thereuopoda is a centipede genus in the family Scutigeridae.

Species 
 T. chinensis
 T. clunifera
 T. longicornis
 T. sandakana

References

External links

Centipede genera